Tragia ramosa is a species of flowering plant in the spurge family known by the common names branched noseburn and desert tragia.

It is native to the southern Great Plains, South Central, and Southwestern United States and Northern Mexico. It grows in scrub, woodland, and other desert and plateau habitat.

Description
Tragia ramosa is a perennial herb growing mostly erect, measuring 10 to 30 centimeters in maximum height. It is covered in long, rough stinging hairs. The leaves have lance-shaped or oval blades with toothed edges which are borne on petioles.

The plant is monoecious. Its inflorescence contains a few male flowers and usually one female flower. The flowers lack petals but have green sepals.

The female flower yields a small capsule.

References

External links

Jepson Manual Treatment
Photo gallery

ramosa
Flora of Northeastern Mexico
Flora of Northwestern Mexico
Flora of the United States
Flora of the Southwestern United States
Flora of the South-Central United States
Flora of the California desert regions
Flora of New Mexico
Flora of the Sonoran Deserts
Natural history of the Mojave Desert
Flora of the Mexican Plateau
Flora without expected TNC conservation status